Ashdod Light, is a lighthouse in Ashdod, Israel. The site and the lighthouse are closed to the public.

The lighthouse is listed as active on the NGA List of Lights of 2019, as well as on the April 2021 update of The Lighthouse Directory. However, some less official sources claim that it is inactive at least since November 2009.

The lighthouse appeared on an Israeli stamp issued 26 November 2009. It also appeared on the first day of issue postmark for that series of stamps.

History
The lighthouse was built in 1966 as part of the construction of the port facilities.  It used the glass optic removed from the Jaffa Light which was decommissioned in the same year.

The lighthouse was a distinctive mark of the city of Ashdod, appearing in many publications.

See also

 List of lighthouses in Israel

References

Lighthouses completed in 1966
Lighthouses in Israel
Light